Battle of Prague may refer to:

Battle of White Mountain (1620), an early battle in the Thirty Years' War
Battle of Prague (1648), the last action of the Thirty Years' War
Siege of Prague (1742), a siege during the War of the Austrian Succession
Battle of Prague (1757), a battle in which the Prussians defeated the Austrians in the Seven Years' War
Siege of Prague, which directly followed the 1757 battle
Prague Offensive (1945), the last major Soviet operation of World War II in Europe